State Route 846 (SR 846) is a secondary route in the U.S. state of Virginia entirely located in Loudoun County. Its northeastern terminus is in Sterling on Cardinal Glen Circle, past SR 7. Traveling southwest, SR 846 is North Sterling Boulevard, eventually becoming South Sterling Boulevard. After passing SR 28 at a cloverleaf interchange, SR 846 ends at Pacific Boulevard.

Major intersections

References

External links

846 Loudoun